Mike Biggar (born 20 November 1949) is a former Scotland international rugby union player.

Rugby Union career

Amateur career

Biggar was educated at Sedbergh School in Cumbria, where he was Head of School, then went up to Queens' College, Cambridge, where he read Law and won a Blue in rugby in 1971.

He went on to play for London Scottish.

Provincial career

He played for the Anglo-Scots district.

International career

He was capped by Scotland 'B' to play against France 'B' in 1975.

He appeared for Scotland in 24 international matches between 1975 and 1980, four times as captain.

Administrative career

He is a vice-president of Minety Rugby Club.

Car accident and health

In 1992, he was involved in an automobile accident in which he sustained severe head injuries and became disabled, requiring a wheelchair and unable to walk without difficulty.

In 2020, during the COVID-19 pandemic, while recovering from a debilitating kidney infection, and inspired by Captain Tom Moore, he decided to try to raise £1,000 for NHS Charities Together by walking 100 steps in a month. As of 10 August 2021, he had raised over £77,000 via JustGiving.

Family

He lives in Malmesbury, Wiltshire, with his wife Ali. Fellow London Scottish and Scotland player Alastair Biggar was his cousin.

References 

1949 births
Living people
Cambridge University R.U.F.C. players
London Scottish F.C. players
Rugby union flankers
Rugby union players from Aberdeen
Scotland 'B' international rugby union players
Scotland international rugby union players
Scottish Exiles (rugby union) players
Scottish rugby union players
Wheelchair users